"Do You Believe Me Now" is a song co-written and recorded by American country music artist Vern Gosdin.  It was released in November 1987 as the first single from the album Chiseled in Stone.  The song reached #4 on the Billboard Hot Country Singles & Tracks chart.  Gosdin wrote the song with Max D. Barnes.

Charts

Weekly charts

Year-end charts

References

1988 singles
1987 songs
Vern Gosdin songs
Songs written by Max D. Barnes
Songs written by Vern Gosdin
Song recordings produced by Bob Montgomery (songwriter)
Columbia Records singles